Gorce or La Gorce may refer to:

Gorce (surname), including La Gorce and de La Gorce
La Gorce Open, American golf tournament

Places:
Gorce Mountains in southern Poland
Gorce National Park, part of Western Beskids
Gorce, a former town in south-western Poland, now part of Boguszów-Gorce in Wałbrzych County
Gorče, Slovenia, a small settlement
La Gorce, a neighborhood of Miami Beach, Florida, United States
La Gorce Island, Miami Beach, Florida
La Gorce Mountains, Marie Byrd Land, Antarctica
La Gorce Peak, part of the Alexandra Mountains, Marie Byrd Land

See also
Gorse (disambiguation)